Home Fires is the second studio album by Australian country music band Dead Ringer Band. The album was released in November 1995.

At the ARIA Music Awards of 1996, the album won the ARIA Award for Best Country Album.

Track listing

Release history

References

1995 albums
ARIA Award-winning albums
Dead Ringer Band albums